Belgian railway signalling is the signalling in effect on the Belgian rail network currently operated by Infrabel.

Preamble 

There are in Belgium two types of train movement:

 'major movement' (e.g. mainline operation) that occurs during normal operation (traffic moves at the speed permitted by the signalling and regulations);

The change from one movement to the other is done by signals (main stop signals) or a written order.

The first movement (which is always executed as minor movement) happens in the following situations: 
 a driver taking over a new train;
 a change in driver's cab or direction of travel;
 receipt, change or removal of train number;
 vehicles that can drive on themselves are coupled or uncoupled
 when permission is needed to continue to drive after an incident
 when beginning to shunt

Within major movement, there are two regimes, linked to bi-directional operation on double track lines:
 normal track regime: the signals are located on the left of the track. However, in some cases, the configuration of the environment precludes placing signs on the left track. They are then placed on the right and have an arrow (white arrow on a blue disc).
 counter-flow track regime: the signals are located on the right of the track and the aspects are blinking.

The most common way of regime change is by the display of a chevron (V-shaped) sign on a main stop sign (single or combined).

In minor movement, all signals are to be obeyed, both those of the left hand track and the right hand; signals controlling  only minor movements are placed on the left.  In counter-flow operation, some signals (light or otherwise) are specifically dedicated to minor movements and therefore are ignored by the trains travelling in major movement.

Light signals
The lights are designed and arranged to be visible from a distance (up to two kilometers on a clear day). For this they are equipped with lenses to focus light rays emitted by the bulb, which can be selected and reasonable power. That is why the lights do not seem very intense when viewed from the side while they light up sharply in normal line of vision i.e. in the direction of arrival of the train.

Note that the yellow lights often are orange in reality.

Plain stop signal 
The red aspect requires a halt for both major and minor movements. It can be opened for major movement (green when the track gives access to a mainline, or double yellow in stations) or minor movement (red + white). It gives no information about the aspect of the next signal.

A white number below the main aspect restricts the speed (from the first switch or track junction after the signal).

Above the main aspect, the signal can show a chevron (to change the regime), or a "U" (when the train is led towards a dead end).

It can be mounted on a mast or gantry (above the track).

Warning signal 
Warns of the aspect of a following main stop signal:  
It  can show a green aspect (the next signal is open without restrictions), double yellow (the next signal is at the stop aspect), green-yellow horizontal (the next signal requires a speed reduction) or green-yellow vertical (double warning in the case of a short section between the next signal and the signal after that, which has a red aspect or imposes a speed restriction).

It may also present a yellow number above the signal with the main aspects green-yellow horizontal and green-yellow vertical and thus the speed (in tens of km/h) with respect to the next signal.

Combined main stop signal 
Serves as both a stop signal and a warning signal and can therefore, according to the needs of the position, present aspects of both a plain stop signal and a warning signal. This type of signal is the most common one on the mainline network.

Simplified stop signal 
It can either be placed at ground level or elevated (on a post).

Small stop signal

It is placed on the ground.

An older version of the small stop signal has the appearance of the simplified signal above, but with a purple instead of a red light.

Completed operations indicator (IOT) 
The Completed operations  indicator is a system composed of a set of switches (activation) and light signals (display) on platforms of most stations and allows the guard to announce to the driver (conductor) that the procedure for boarding is completed and the train can start.

Where the system is installed, the yellow aspect (or white on older systems) is a prerequisite for the departure of passenger trains.

Aspects displayed by major stop signals and warning signals

Signs

Speed signs 

 
 
Additional  panels (special triangles, for example) are used to indicate that only certain types of trains are affected: e.g., "HKM" means the sign only concerns freight trains .

Some other signs
{| Class = "wikitable left" width = "690" 
|- Style = "display: none" 
!Image!!Explanation 
|-- 
| style = "background: # EEE; text-align: center" |  
| 'Control reference line: indicate on what line it is headed. 
|-- 
| style = "background: # EEE; text-align: center" |  
|Catenary end sign:  indicates the end of the zone powered by overhead wire. Electric trains must halt. 
|-- 
| style = "background: # EEE; text-align: center" |  
|'' 'Expect lower pantograph: Warns of upcoming 'lower pantograph' signal. 
|-- 
| style = "background: # EEE; text-align: center" | 
| 'Lower Pantograph'|-- 
| style = "background: # EEE; text-align: center" |  
| 'Raise pantograph: end of zone in which pantograph(s) had to be lowered. 
|} 

 Other signals 

Other signals complement the fixed signs: 
 Mobile signals (light at night / low visibility, flag day) red, yellow and green;
 Acoustic signals (detonators, horns);
 Torch flame red lights flashing (requiring 'halt');

 Cab signalling 

The TBL1+ system was designed in 2006 by the Belgian subsidiary of the Alstom Transport group. This is the new standard for Belgian signalling, supposed to be deployed on most lines equipped with conventional signalling. The signals are the same as classic ones, but they are combined with automatic train control and cab signalling.

The trigger for developing this system was the Pécrot disaster in March 2001 when two trains collided head-on because a driver had passed a red signal, highlighting the finding that the majority of lines, no system prevented the train from passing a stop signal. It was therefore decided to invest in such a system.

At the time, however, the existing TBL1 system offered this feature of automatic stop at red lights, but only a few main lines were equipped (or approximately 13% of signals). NMBS/SNCB decided therefore to abandon this TBL1 system and modified to make it compatible with the new European ERTMS standard in terms of ground infrastructure, becoming the system TBL1+.

Today, the TBL1+ system is undergoing testing and certification. It will be installed from 2008, the objective being to equip the entire network by 2013.Status of introduction of TBL1+'''

Basics 

The TBL1+ system is a system of driving aids to repeat the signals aspects in the cab, and to intervene if the driver does not comply with the directions given by these signals. 
Unlike systems such as ERTMS TBL2 which supervise a speed curve, the TBL1+ system does only  a spot-check when passing light signals. This is done with a beacon placed in the track, which transmits to the onboard computer a message containing the signal aspect. 
We can classify the appearance of a signal into three broad categories:

Clear aspect 
This aspect indicates that the track is clear and allows the train to run at maximum speed allowed. This is typically a green signal. 
When the train passes a signal as the TBL1+ system simply repeats information and makes a short sound in his cab (the lamps used to indicate a possible restriction are also extinct).

Restrictive aspects 
This type of aspect requires the driver to slow, for example, because the next signal shows a non-clear aspect (double yellow) or imposes a speed limit (yellow-green horizontal).

When the train passes a signal as the driver must confirm that he saw the signal by pushing a button, otherwise the system will apply the emergency brake. In addition, a yellow lamp is lit in the cabin to remind the driver that runs under a restrictive regime.

Stop aspect 
This type of aspect (typically a red signal) instructs the driver to halt and can not be passed by a train (except with a special procedure).

If the train passes a signal showing a stop aspect, the TBL1+ system immediately applies the emergency brake and flashes a red light in the cab, forcing the train to stop completely and as quickly as possible.

Although TBL1+ does not control the speed curve, the system does include a reduced speed control. In this mode, indicated by the "V <40" LED display, the train speed can not exceed , otherwise the emergency brake is applied. This mode is used for shunting, and also the approach of a stop signal, so as to operate an advance emergency braking if the train passes a warning signal at a too high speed. Switching to this mode can be done manually by the driver or automatically using the beacon on the ground.

Ground equipment 

In both  TBL1 or TBL2 the aspect of the signal is transmitted to the train through beacons placed in the right way for this signal using an encoder to translate the appearance of this signal into computer message (i.e. a sequence of bits).

The big difference with the previous systems is the fact that the TBL1+ beacons are identical to those used for lines equipped with ERTMS, while the message is compatible with the standard set by ERTMS UNISIG. Therefore, it is quite possible to migrate a line equipped TBL1+ to ERTMS, or even superimpose the two systems without having to change the ground beacons.
 
The TBL1+ system is also compatible with the old system MEMOR, which used "crocodiles" placed on the tracks to transmit the signal aspect, through a positive or negative pulse. When a line is not equipped with TBL1+ beacons, the system uses information provided by crocodiles on the ground, under the limits of MEMOR functionality. In particular, the automatic stop at a stop signal is no longer possible because crocodiles can not convey the aspect of a signal.

On board equipment 

The TBL1+ interface between the driver and the onboard computer consists only of lights and buttons. Here are the main ones:

The alert button is used to acknowledge the passing of a restrictive signal. It also helps to release the emergency brake when equipment TBL1+ train stopped.
 
The yellow light flashes when the train passes a signal showing restrictive aspects to request acknowledgement from the driver, and then remains lit until the train has not met unrestricted signal (but it may be turned off by pressingon this indicator).

The red light flashes when the emergency brake is triggered after the train passes a stop signal, and then remains lit until the train comes to the next signal showing 'track clear'.  (it can however be switched off by pressing the light).

"V <40" and "V> 40" displays indicate whether the TBL1+ system is in "control of low speed" or not. The manual shift mode to another is done by pressing the corresponding LED. 
The button permits temporary disablement of the system, following a strict procedure, temporarily disabling the system to pass signals in such trouble.

The onboard computer is connected to an antenna to read ERTMS tags placed in the path, and a brush-crocodile to capture the information transmitted by crocodiles in the track.

A recorder is also on board the train to keep track of signals encountered and the actions of the driver.

Other cab signalling systems 
TVM 430 on the line 1 
TBL2 on the Line 2 and 
ETCS levels 1 and 2 on the line 3 and Line 4

References 

signalisation
Belrail.be guide to signals 
Wallorail.be guide to signals 
HLT Booklet of the NMBS/SNCB (Rules for train drivers)

External links 

 Cab view video Forest to Lille with signals explained

Belgium